Kara-Suu is a town in Osh Region, Kyrgyzstan, in the Fergana Valley. The town is 23 km northeast of Osh and is the capital of Kara-Suu District. Its population was 26,609 in 2021. It is a major industrial and trade center, on the border with Uzbekistan. On the other side of the border is the town Qorasuv (before 1991: Ilyichovsk). After the dissolution of the Soviet Union, the Uzbek authorities destroyed the main bridge across the river, but cross-border trade continued via improvised ropeways that ferried goods and people across.

The Karasuu Bazaar in the Kyrgyz town of Kara-Suu is a highly important center of import of Chinese consumer goods into Southern Kyrgyzstan, Uzbekistan and Tajikistan, comparable with Dordoy Bazaar in Bishkek (which targets Northern Kyrgyzstan, Kazakh and Russian markets).

Kara-Suu gained international prominence following the May 2005 unrest in Uzbekistan and massacre in nearby Andijan, after which refugees streamed across the border into Kyrgyzstan.

Demographics
The permanent population of Kara-Suu, according to the Population and Housing Census of 2009, was 20,862. The average age was 26.5 years.

Sports
Abdygany Radzhapov Central Stadium

References

Populated places in Osh Region
Kyrgyzstan–Uzbekistan border crossings